The Stele of Ushumgal is an early Sumerian stone tablet, dating to the Early Dynastic I-II (circa 2900-2700 BCE), and probably originating from Umma. It is currently located in the Metropolitan Museum of Art, New York.

The stele is 22 cm high. It is partially deciphered, refers to an early transfer of land ownership. A large man is inscribed with a label, which can be read “Ušumgal, the pab-šeš priest of (the deity) Šara”. On the other side stands a female with an unclear name, probably the daughter of Ushumgal.

The stele has been described as a type of "ancient Kudurru", a sort of stele known from the Kassites period in the 2nd millennium BCE.

The name "Akka" appears in the Stele of Ushumgal, as Ak gal-ukkin, "Ak gal-ukkin official". It has been suggested this could refer to Aga of Kish himself.

See also
Blau Monuments
Warka Vase

References

External links
 Complete transliteration of the inscriptions

3rd-millennium BC steles
Ancient Near East steles
Archaeology of Iraq
Stone sculptures
Sculptures of the Metropolitan Museum of Art
Early Dynastic Period (Mesopotamia)
Umma